The NWL Ladies Championship is the top women's professional wrestling title in the National Wrestling League promotion. It was created when Bambi defeated Heidi Lee Morgan to become first champion in 1990. The title was defended primarily in the Mid-Atlantic and East Coast, most often in Hagerstown, Maryland, but also in Pennsylvania and West Virginia. It was originally retired in 2003, reinstated as the NWL/HoPWF Ladies Championship in 2005 and the NWL Ladies Championship in 2007. There were 12 recognized known champions with a total of 21 title reigns.

Title history

HoPWF Women's Championship

References

Women's professional wrestling championships